The 2018–19 AHL season was the 83rd season of the American Hockey League. The regular season began October 5, 2018 and ended April 15, 2019. The 2019 Calder Cup playoffs followed the conclusion of the regular season.

League changes
The league expanded by adding the Colorado Eagles to the Pacific Division and moved the two Texas-based teams to the Central Division from the Pacific. The Cleveland Monsters were moved from the Central to the North Division.

Similar to the California and Arizona teams in the Pacific Division, Colorado plays 68 games in the regular season. This gave the Pacific Division a balanced schedule for the first time since its creation in 2015 and removed the necessity for playoff qualification based on points percentage. Continuing from previous seasons, the teams in the Atlantic, North, and Central Divisions all play 76 games. The Macgregor Kilpatrick Trophy for the regular season champion is still awarded based on points percentage.

Team and NHL affiliation changes
After the National Hockey League (NHL) added the Vegas Golden Knights for the 2017–18 season, the NHL had 31 teams while the AHL still had 30. After exploring other AHL expansion options, the NHL Vegas expansion team eventually affiliated with the Chicago Wolves on a multi-year agreement. The affiliation with the Wolves left their former affiliate, the St. Louis Blues, without an affiliate and the Blues would send players to the Wolves and the San Antonio Rampage, the affiliate of the Colorado Avalanche.

After the 2017 Board of Governors meeting, the league confirmed that it had made a commitment to an expansion applicant for a 31st team for the 2018–19 season later revealed to be the Colorado Eagles. The Eagles organization had been a member of the ECHL prior to the promotion and was the affiliate of the Avalanche. The Eagles join other recently added ECHL markets in the AHL such as Bakersfield, Charlotte, Ontario, and Stockton. The Blues then became the primary affiliate of the Rampage.

Affiliation changes

Final standings 

 indicates team has clinched division and a playoff spot
 indicates team has clinched a playoff spot
 indicates team has been eliminated from playoff contention

Eastern Conference 
As of April 14, 2019

Western Conference 
As of April 14, 2019

Statistical leaders

Leading skaters 
The following players are sorted by points, then goals. Updated as of April 14, 2019.

GP = Games played; G = Goals; A = Assists; Pts = Points; +/– = Plus-minus; PIM = Penalty minutes

Leading goaltenders 
The following goaltenders with a minimum 1500 minutes played lead the league in goals against average. Updated as of April 14, 2019.

GP = Games played; TOI = Time on ice (in minutes); SA = Shots against; GA = Goals against; SO = Shutouts; GAA = Goals against average; SV% = Save percentage; W = Wins; L = Losses; OT = Overtime/shootout loss

Calder Cup playoffs

Playoff format
The 2019 Calder Cup playoffs format was retained from the divisional format of the 2016 Calder Cup playoffs. During the regular season, teams receive two points for a win and one point for an overtime or shootout loss. The top four teams in each division ranked by points qualify for the 2019 Calder Cup playoffs.

The 2019 Calder Cup playoffs features a divisional playoff format, leading to conference finals and ultimately the Calder Cup finals. The division semifinals are best-of-five series; all subsequent rounds are best-of-seven.

Bracket

AHL awards

All-Star Teams
First All-Star Team
Alex Nedeljkovic (G) – Charlotte
John Gilmour (D) – Hartford
Zach Redmond (D) – Rochester
Jeremy Bracco (F) – Toronto
Daniel Carr (F) – Chicago
Carter Verhaeghe (F) – Syracuse

Second All-Star Team
Shane Starrett (G) – Bakersfield
Aaron Ness (D) – Hershey
Ethan Prow (D) – Wilkes-Barre/Scranton
Tyler Benson (F) – Bakersfield
Chris Mueller (F) – Toronto
Andrew Poturalski (F) – Charlotte

All-Rookie Team
Shane Starrett (G) – Bakersfield
Jake Bean (D) – Charlotte
Mitch Reinke (D) – San Antonio
Drake Batherson (F) – Belleville
Tyler Benson (F) – Bakersfield
Alex Barre-Boulet (F) – Syracuse

See also
List of AHL seasons
2018 in ice hockey
2019 in ice hockey

References

External links
AHL official site

 
American Hockey League seasons
2018–19 in American ice hockey by league
2018–19 in Canadian ice hockey by league